Hard as Nails may refer to:

 Hard as Nails (novel), 2003, by Dan Simmons
 "Hard as Nails" (Static Shock), an episode of Static Shock
 "Hard as Nails", a song by Raven from the album Nothing Exceeds Like Excess